Shu-turul (Shu-durul, shu-tur2-ul3) was the last king of the Akkadian Empire, ruling for 15 years according to the Sumerian king list. It indicates that he succeeded his father Dudu. A few artifacts, seal impressions etc. attest that he held sway over a greatly reduced Akkadian territory that included Kish, Tutub, and Eshnunna. The Diyala river also bore the name "Shu-durul" at the time.

Sumerian King List
The king list asserts that Akkad was then conquered, and the hegemony returned to Uruk following his reign. It further lists six names of an Uruk dynasty; however none of these six rulers has been confirmed through archaeology.  The actual situation of Akkad's collapse, from all evidence outside the king list, is that it was brought about directly by the Gutians, who had established their capital at Adab, though several of the southern city-states such as Uruk, Ur and Lagash also declared independence around this time.

Inscriptions
A few inscriptions in his name are known. One reads:

A votive mace is also known with an inscription mentioning Shu-turul and the dedication of a temple to Nergal:

External links
 Known inscriptions of Shu-turul

Sources 

22nd-century BC kings of Akkad
Akkadian people
Sumerian kings